Paulina Schippers (born 2 April 1991 in Guatemala City) is a Guatemalan former tennis player.

Having played for the Guatemala Fed Cup team between 2007 and 2012, Schippers has a win–loss record of 11–3 in international competition.

Paulina has a younger sister, Daniela, who is also a tennis player.

References

External links
 
 
 

1991 births
Living people
Sportspeople from Guatemala City
Guatemalan female tennis players
Auburn Tigers women's tennis players